Patrick Smyth (born August 6, 1986) is an American long distance runner.

College career
Smyth was a seven-time All-American and three-time Big East Conference champion. While at the University of Notre Dame he set a 10,000-meter school record of 28:25.85 and ranked 11th at the 2008 NCAA Championships in cross-country.

International career
Smyth competed in the 2010 IAAF World Cross Country Championships and the 2015 IAAF World Cross Country Championships.

He was also the 2013 XTERRA trail running champion.

References

External links

Living people
1986 births
American male long-distance runners
American male marathon runners
American male mountain runners